Machine Design is an American trade magazine and website serving the OEM engineering market. Its print issues reach qualified design engineers and engineering managers twice a month.

Key technologies covered include computer-aided design and manufacturing (CAD/CAM), electrical and electronics, fastening and joining, fluid power, manufacturing, engineered materials, mechanical engineering, and motion control.
 
Today, Machine Design is owned by Informa, and has editorial offices based in New York, New York and Cleveland, Ohio, USA.

History
The inaugural issue of Machine Design coincided almost exactly with the 1929 stock-market crash and the beginning of the Great Depression. Although the nation was in the economic doldrums, there was significant design development taking place in almost all industrial segments including automotive, aircraft, farm equipment, home appliances, and industrial machinery.
 
The onset of World War II came and brought almost frenetic activity to design engineering at large. After the war, civilian industries thrived. But in the years following the war and into the 1950s the role of design engineer languished, stigmatized by the war effort as the creator of new means of destruction.

Engineering colleges began to feel slighted because doctors, lawyers, and business executives were viewed as having more prestige and professional status than their engineering graduates. Intellectual elites viewed engineering colleges as trade schools, and graduate engineers were said to be nothing more than mechanics or glorified shop hands. In response, engineering schools began to drop courses that lacked academic rigor or had the slightest blue-collar aura.
 
The launch of Sputnik in 1957 again changed the perception of design engineering. The perceived loss of world leadership in air and space technology by the people of the United States set the stage for a considerable renewal of prestige to the engineering discipline. After more than a decade into the Cold War, the public realized science and engineering could play a key role in keeping the Communists at bay. The government unloaded almost limitless supplies of money on high-tech defense industries, and engineering became the career of choice. High salaries and generous perks were lavished on engineers and scientists.
 
Unfortunately, Sputnik also accelerated the movement to delete courses on manufacturing and shop practice from the curricula of top schools. The idea was to portray engineers as being more scientist than a mechanic. The rocket scientist working on the space program became the image to which most engineers aspired.

This attitude had a lot to do with framing the editorial policies of Machine Design through the 1960s. The policies were in tune with what was happening in the largest and most-sophisticated corporations, especially the aircraft and automotive industries, where design engineering and manufacturing engineering were increasingly treated as separate entities having no common interest. Reflecting this, articles selected for Machine Design were carefully tailored not to have too much of a manufacturing orientation.

Starting in the late 1960s, another shift in American perception was brought about by the growing awareness of overseas manufacturing facilities returning a lower cost product with higher quality. While lower labor rates played a key role in the lower costs, they could not justify the higher reliability of offshore products over those domestically produced. It was soon discovered that those shops with higher quality production realized design and manufacturing engineering were closely intertwined. Machine Design articles started to reflect this trend. For example, it's believed to be the first industrial trade magazine to run a comprehensive article explaining numerical control machining and how it relates to design engineering.

Machine Design'''s coverage of manufacturing positioned it well when concurrent engineering became the trendy idea in industry. Major corporations suddenly discovered that design and manufacturing were interrelated, and it became vogue to tear down the walls between design and manufacturing engineers.

In the 1970s, finite-element analysis broke on the industrial scene. Computer-aided design was evolving, and by the 1980s, it was also having a profound impact on design procedures. Computer-aided manufacturing evolved separately, but by 1990 CAD and CAM had merged. In the field of electrical and electronic technology, relay controls were giving way to digital electronics and the microprocessor that led to combining a number of design disciplines into the technologies of mechatronics and motion control.

In the 2000s, the Internet of Things has taken hold of the industry and has infiltrated every level of engineering, from design to manufacturing, all the way to predictive maintenance and augmented reality. Machine Design as provided in-depth coverage on these emerging technologies to keep engineers up to date on what lies in store for the engineering industry. 

For over 80 years, Machine Design'' had predicted and led the industrial community spotting trends and fundamental changes in manufacturing operations. Providing an ongoing series of technological overviews interspersed with in-depth tutorials, it kept readers abreast of technologies that were transforming product design. It does this with an editorial staff of degreed engineers possessing industrial experience and obligated to create lucid and interesting articles supported by the intelligent use of graphics.

References

 BPA Worldwide

External links
Machine Design website

Business magazines published in the United States
Magazines established in 1929
Magazines published in New York (state)
Professional and trade magazines
Design magazines
Engineering magazines